The Craft: Legacy, also known as Blumhouse's The Craft: Legacy, is a 2020 American supernatural horror film written and directed by Zoe Lister-Jones. A stand-alone sequel to The Craft (1996), the film stars Cailee Spaeny, Gideon Adlon, Lovie Simone, and Zoey Luna as four teenage girls who practice witchcraft as a coven. Additional cast include Nicholas Galitzine, Michelle Monaghan, and David Duchovny, with Fairuza Balk making a cameo appearance.

The Craft: Legacy was released in the United States through video on demand on October 28, 2020, by Sony Pictures Releasing under its Columbia Pictures label, with a theatrical release in select international markets beginning the same day. The film has grossed over $2.3 million worldwide and received mixed reviews from critics, and earned a nomination for the 2021 GLAAD Media Award for Outstanding Wide Release Film.

Plot
The film begins with three girls, Frankie, Tabby, and Lourdes, trying to freeze time with magic, but failing as they require a fourth member. Lily Schechner moves into the town with her therapist mother, Helen, to live with Helen's new boyfriend Adam Harrison and his three sons, Jacob, Isaiah, and Abe. The girls befriend Lily after she has her period in class and is mocked by her other classmates, particularly by the school bully Timmy Andrews. They are amazed when she telekinetically pushes Timmy into the lockers. When Lily responds to them using only her mind, the girls confirm her to be their fourth member and invite her to join their coven, to which she agrees. As a result, they succeed in freezing time.

To seek revenge on Timmy, the girls cast a spell on him. The next day, Timmy behaves sensitively, confirming the girls' success. They continue to experiment with their powers, including levitation. Adam learns of the incident in school and scolds Lily, but Helen defends her. Lily overhears them arguing and goes outside where Abe talks to her about his father's authoritarian beliefs. Timmy hosts a party, inviting the coven, and apologizes to Lily, eventually becoming friends with the coven. When Timmy is at Lily's home for a project with Jacob, he admits to the girls that he had sex with Isaiah, Jacob's elder brother and that he is bisexual. Later, Lily places a love spell on Timmy, using his sweatshirt, and the two kiss.

The next morning, during class, the coven is told by their teacher that Timmy allegedly committed suicide the night before. Lily opens up to her friends about her kiss and love spell. They sever ties with her and bind themselves from magic. Lily suspects Adam to be dangerous and asks her mother for them to move out, but she does not agree. In hopes of finding something against Adam, she searches his office only to find her own adoption papers, forcing Helen to admit to her that Lily is actually her patient's child. After Timmy's funeral, Helen tells Lily she agrees to move out. Helen also admits that she knows about her powers of telepathy, telekinesis, and magic. The conversation prompts Helen to ask Lily to give her powers to Helen. When Lily suspects her, Helen shapeshifts and turns out to be a disguise by Adam, who, being part of a pagan cult, has been after her powers since the beginning and knocks her unconscious.

Lily awakens in a forest at night with Adam, who confesses that he murdered Timmy and threatens to kill her too. When Timmy contacts Lily's friends through a Ouija board and tells them about being murdered by Adam, they arrive to save Lily by freezing time, but Adam subdues them quickly. The girls then work together and use their elemental powers to defeat Adam, burning him to death. Later, Lily continues her friendship with the girls and Helen takes her to a mental health hospital to meet her birth mother, who is revealed to be Nancy Downs.

Cast

Production

Development
A straight-to-DVD sequel to The Craft was in the works circa 2010, but was terminated. In May 2016, Sony Pictures announced that a sequel to The Craft was in development and would be written and directed by Leigh Janiak. The announcement of the sequel spawned negative reactions from fans of the original.

In March 2019 Zoe Lister-Jones was named as writer and director of the soft reboot, with Jason Blum as producer under his Blumhouse Productions banner, with Andrew Fleming (director of the 1996 film) as executive producer, and Columbia Pictures distributing.

Casting
In June 2019, Cailee Spaeny was set to star in the film. In September 2019, Gideon Adlon, Lovie Simone, and Zoey Luna joined the cast as the other witches. In October 2019, Nicholas Galitzine, David Duchovny, Julian Grey, and Michelle Monaghan were also added, and in November 2019, Donald MacLean Jr. was cast.

Filming
Principal photography began in October 2019. During filming in Toronto, director Zoe Lister-Jones explained in an on-set interview that The Craft sequel “... centers on young people, and young women specifically coming into their power in today’s current climate..."

Music
The film's original music, composed by Heather Christian, was released digitally by Madison Gate Records on October 28, 2020.

Release
The Craft: Legacy was released on video on demand by Sony Pictures Releasing on October 28, 2020, followed by a theatrical release internationally. The film was released on Blu-ray and DVD on December 22, 2020 by Sony Pictures Home Entertainment.

Reception

Box office
In its first weekend the film earned $680,000 while in the following weekend it earned $390,000 and in its third $242,000.

Critical response
The website's critics' consensus reads, "Although director Zoe Lister-Jones has forged a new path for the weirdos of today, The Craft: Legacys spells may only enchant fans of the original." On Metacritic, the film has a score of 54 out of 100 based on reviews from 24 critics, indicating "mixed or average reviews".

Kate Erbland, writing for Indiewire, said the film is "an entertaining and insightful mashup of tropes, both respectful of what came before and willing to try new tricks."
Sheila O'Malley of RogerEbert.com gave the film two stars, saying, "The Craft: Legacy gets sidetracked with the Timmy sub-plot, and the film morphs into a teenage soap opera and/or ABC Afterschool Special."

Accolades 
The Craft: Legacy was nominated for the 2021 GLAAD Media Award for Outstanding Film (Wide Release).

Future
In October 2020, when interviewed about Fairuza Balk's cameo, Zoe Lister-Jones explained that she wrote the script with a continuation in mind. Lister-Jones also revealed that she had met with the original film's actresses during the preparation for Legacy and that she would be interested in making a third installment with an intergenerational storyline.

References

External links
 

2020 films
2020 fantasy films
2020 horror films
2020 LGBT-related films
2020s American films
2020s English-language films
2020s fantasy drama films
2020s feminist films
2020s high school films
2020s supernatural horror films
2020s teen drama films
2020s teen fantasy films
2020s teen horror films
American dark fantasy films
American fantasy drama films
American feminist films
American high school films
American horror drama films
American sequel films
American supernatural horror films
American teen drama films
American teen horror films
American teen LGBT-related films
Blumhouse Productions films
Columbia Pictures films
Films about school bullying
Films about trans women
Films about Wicca
Films about witchcraft
Films directed by Zoe Lister-Jones
Films produced by Douglas Wick
Films produced by Jason Blum
Films produced by Lucy Fisher
Films shot in Toronto
LGBT-related horror drama films
Male bisexuality in film
Supernatural drama films